Oallen is a locality in the Goulburn Mulwaree Council area, New South Wales, Australia. It is located on the Shoalhaven River and the Oallen Ford Road about 61 km southeast of Goulburn and 82 km southwest of Nowra. The Oallen Ford Road has recently been upgraded to improve the connection from Canberra and Goulburn to Nerriga, Nowra and Jervis Bay.

The Shoalhaven River in the Oallen Ford area was an area where gold was panned for in the 19th century. There has been a recent revival of gold panning.

References

Localities in New South Wales
Southern Tablelands
Goulburn Mulwaree Council
Queanbeyan–Palerang Regional Council